Yam Ski Resort, also calls Payam Ski Resort, is a ski resort in Marand in North of Tabriz, East Azerbaijan, Iran operated by East Azerbaijan Province Ski Federation. The resort is located in the northern foothills of Mishodaghi. It is one of the oldest ski resorts in Iran that still operating. The resort have a ski lift. Ski season in Yam resort depends on winter precipitation each year which normally starts in January and continues till end of March. This resort also considered a summer resort and attracts visitors from nearby cities.

External links
 
 An Azerbaijani introduction to Payam Ski Resort

References

Ski areas and resorts in Iran
Sports venues in Tabriz